Antoine Le Métel d'Ouville, (c. 1589 in Caen – 1655), was a 17th-century French engineer, geographer, poet and playwright.

Presentation 
The brother of François Le Métel de Boisrobert, d'Ouville had some comedies presented, less remarkable for their versification than by the plot, among others les Trahisons d'Abhiran, a tragicomedy successfully given in 1637.

He also authored les nouvelles amoureuses et exemplaires ; Aymer sans sçavoir qui, comedy ; La Coifeuse à la mode, comedy ; les Fausses Véritez, comedy ; les Morts vivants, tragicomedy ; l'Esprit follet, comedy ; la Fouyne de Séville, ou l'hameçon des bourses ; l'Absent chez soy ; l'Élite des contes ; les Contes aux heures perdues ou Le recueil de tous les bons mots, réparties, équivoques du sieur d'Ouville ; Jodelet astrologue, encouraged by Scarron's success.

Under his name we also have Tales (2 vol. in-12), partly drawn from Moyen de parvenir which was attributed to his brother. He translated from Spanish to French.

Works 
 Les Trahizons d'Arbiran, tragicomedy 
1634: Stances a Monseigneur le Cardinal duc de Richelieu… 
1642: L'Esprit follet, comedy (imitated from Calderón) 
1643: L'Absent chez soy, five-act comedy, in verse
1643: Les contes aux heures perdues du sieur d'Ouville ou Le recueil de tous les bons mots, réparties, équivoques 
1643: Les Fausses Infidelitez, five-act comedy 
1645: La Dame suivante, comedy
1646: Jodelet astrologue, five-act comedy 
1646: Les Morts vivants, tragicomedy 
1647: Aymer sans sçavoir qui, comedy 
1647: La Coifeuse à la mode, comedy
1650: Les Soupçons sur les apparences, héroïco-comedy 
1680: L'Élite des contes
Translations
 La Fouyne de Séville, ou L'hameçon des bourses, Alonso de Castillo Solórzano, 1661 
 Histoire de dona Rufine, dite la fameuse courtisane de Séville, Alonso de Castillo Solórzano, 1731 
 Les Nouvelles amoureuses et exemplaires, María de Zayas y Sotomayor, 1656

Recent editions 
 Théâtre complet, t. I, édition de Monica Pavesio, Classiques Garnier, 2013  (includes L'Esprit follet, Les Fausses Vérités, Jodelet astrologue)
 Théâtre complet, t. II, édition de Anne Teulade, Classiques Garnier, 2013  (includes L'Absent chez soi, Les Trahisons d'Arbiran, Les Soupçons sur les apparences)

Notes

External links 
 His plays and their presentations on CÉSAR
 His works online on Gallica

17th-century French male writers
17th-century French dramatists and playwrights
17th-century French poets
French translators
Spanish–French translators
Writers from Normandy
Year of birth missing
1655 deaths